Taha Cengiz Demirtaş (born 15 May 1994) is a Turkish professional footballer who plays as a goalkeeper for Sivas Belediyespor.

Professional career
Demirtaş made his debut for Gençlerbirliği in a 1-0  Süper Lig win over Bursaspor on 18 May 2018.

International career
Demirtaş has represented the Turkish Football Federation at the U15 and U16 levels.

References

External links
 
 
 

1994 births
People from Altındağ, Ankara
Living people
Turkish footballers
Turkey youth international footballers
Association football goalkeepers
Hacettepe S.K. footballers
Gençlerbirliği S.K. footballers
Ümraniyespor footballers
Zonguldakspor footballers
Süper Lig players
TFF First League players
TFF Second League players
TFF Third League players